Moronene is an Austronesian language spoken in Bombana Regency, Southeast Sulawesi, Indonesia. It belongs to the Bungku–Tolaki branch of the Celebic subgroup.

Phonology 
Moronene has the following consonant inventory:

Sequences of two like vowels are pronounced as a long vowel, e.g.  .

Grammar

Word order 
Moronene has flexible word order. However, there is a high frequency of clause-initial verbs in "connected narrative discourse." Noun phrases are not marked for case.  The language has prepositions.

Pronouns 
There are two forms of pronouns, free pronouns and absolutive clitics. There are singular and plural forms, there are no dual, trial or paucal forms. There is an inclusive/exclusive distinction in the first person plural forms. There is no gender, and there appears to be no present-day politeness distinction.

Genitive pronouns 
There are two classes of genitive pronouns in Moronene which must be learned by speakers, which is unique among Bungku–Tolaki languages. There are singular and plural forms; there are no dual, trial or paucal forms. There is an inclusive/exclusive distinction in the first person plural forms. Example (1) demonstrates the class 1 first person genitive pronoun in use with the noun 'hair'.

Number 
Moronene has a decimal numeral system.

References

Further reading
Mead, David. 1998. Proto–Bungku-Tolaki: Reconstruction of its phonology and aspects of its morphosyntax. PhD dissertation. Houston: Rice University.
Mead, David. 1999. The Bungku–Tolaki languages of south-eastern Sulawesi, Indonesia. Series D-91. Canberra: Pacific Linguistics.
Andersen, T. David. 1999. Moronene numbers. In David Mead (ed.), Studies in Sulawesi linguistics part V, 1-72. Jakarta, Indonesia: Universitas Katolik Indonesia Atma Jaya.
Andersen, T. David. 2006. Topicality and functional voice in Hebrew and Moronene, with application to translation. (Doctoral dissertation, Fuller Theological Seminary; 346pp.)
Andersen, Suree. 1999. When the Moronene say no. In David Mead (ed.), Studies in Sulawesi linguistics part V, 73-112. Jakarta, Indonesia: Universitas Katolik Indonesia Atma Jaya.
Muthalib, Abdul and Johannes F. Pattiasina and Adnan Usmar and Rambe, {}. 1983. Struktur bahasa Moronene. Ujung Pandang: PPBSIDSS. vii+136pp.

Bungku–Tolaki languages
Languages of Sulawesi